Peter F. Carpenter (born 1940) is an American philanthropist and former business executive. Born in San Francisco, Carpenter lived in Florida during his high school years, joining a volunteer fire department. While attending Harvard University for a degree in chemistry, he spent the summers as a smokejumper for the United States Forest Service. After graduating from Harvard in 1962, he became an officer in the United States Air Force. In the 1960s and 70s, he worked for various employers, including Lockheed, Stanford University, and the US Price Commission. He started working for the ALZA Corporation, a pharmaceutical company, in 1976. In 1990, he left his executive vice president position to work in nonprofit leadership. From 2001 to 2018, he served several terms on the board of the Menlo Park Fire District.

Carpenter has been on the board of several nonprofits, including the American Foundation for AIDS Research (1985–1991), Annual Reviews (1994–present), and Village Enterprise Fund (1997–2009).

Early life and education
Peter F. Carpenter was born in San Francisco, California in 1940. Carpenter's father was in the Navy during World War II. He was part of the Boy Scouts of America, becoming an Eagle Scout in 1955. During his high school years, Carpenter lived in rural north Florida, where he was a volunteer firefighter; he helped with both structural and wildland fires. Carpenter graduated with a Bachelor of Arts in chemistry from Harvard University in 1962. His family had the expectation that he would enlist in the armed forces, so he participated in the ROTC at Harvard. He then attended the University of Chicago, graduating with an MBA in 1965.

Career
From 1959–1961, Carpenter was a smokejumper for the United States Forest Service in Redding, California during his summer breaks from Harvard. After his graduation in 1962, he was commissioned as an officer in the United States Air Force, where he had an assignment as a test parachutist because of his smokejumping experience. From 1966–1968, he was the Vietnam program manager for the Advanced Research Projects Agency and served as the Air Force Aide to the White House. In 1969, he was a consultant for Lockheed, where he developed marketing strategies for its Airborne System Division. From 1968–1970, he was assistant director of the Stanford University Center for Materials Research.

He worked as deputy executive director at the US Price Commission from 1971 to 1973, where he investigated illegal price inflation tactics by lumber companies.

In 1976, he began working for the ALZA Corporation, a pharmaceutical company. At ALZA, he oversaw the "highly unusual" and "revolutionary" decision in 1987 to require women to sign an informed consent form to receive their IUD "Progestasert". In 1987, The Washington Post noted that ALZA was "the only pharmaceutical manufacturer to try to make informed consent a condition for use of a marketed prescription product". For several years starting in January 1986, ALZA manufactured the only IUDs available for sale in the US. In 1990, he left his position as executive vice president of ALZA to pursue nonprofit work. In 1993, he testified before the United States House Committee on Small Business, in which he stated that "uncontrolled population growth is the most serious threat there is to the environment, to international stability, and to economic well-being". He noted that reproductive research in the US was underfunded, and provided guidance on what the role of the federal government should be regarding reproductive research. He was also executive director of Stanford University Medical Center and visiting scholar at the Center for Biomedical Ethics at Stanford.

In 2001, he was selected to fill a vacancy on the district board of the Menlo Park Fire District. He was elected to the board three times and appointed once more, becoming the longest-serving board member in the history of the fire district. He stepped down from the board in 2018 after not running for reelection.

Philanthropy
Carpenter has had leadership positions with a variety of non-profit, cultural, and research organizations. In 1991, he founded the Mission and Values Institute. He has been on the board of directors for the publishing company Annual Reviews since 1994. From 1985–1991, he was director of the American Foundation for AIDS Research. From 1997 to 2009, he was on the board of directors of the Village Enterprise Fund. In 2006, he became director of the humanitarian organization InSTEDD. He and his wife Jane Shaw have supported several education initiatives in California, Tanzania, and Bhutan.

Personal life
Carpenter is married to Jane Shaw Carpenter, also a former business executive at ALZA and co-inventor of the scopolamine transdermal patch to treat motion sickness. They have one son, Jonathan Carpenter. Around 2001, he was diagnosed with chronic lymphocytic leukemia (CLL), and he has stated that he was first veteran to be granted benefits by United States Department of Veterans Affairs acknowledging his cancer was a result of Agent Orange exposure during his time in Vietnam.

References

1940 births
Businesspeople from San Francisco
Harvard University alumni
University of Chicago Booth School of Business alumni
United States Forest Service firefighting
United States Air Force airmen
Philanthropists from California
Living people